Karamba Janneh (born October 10, 1989 in Banjul, The Gambia) is a Gambian footballer who currently plays for KidSuper Samba AC in the Eastern Premier Soccer League.

Career
Janneh made his debut for VSI Tampa Bay on 30 March 2013 against Phoenix FC.

Janneh made a professional return to Tampa on April 14, 2016, when he announced as part of the initial roster for the Tampa Bay Rowdies' NPSL reserve side Rowdies 2.

Personal life 
Karamba played during his youth, college and university career besides, his three-year younger brother Lamin Kere (born 1992).

He starred for John F. Kennedy High School in the Bronx, recording 88 goals and 33 assists in only 32 games between 10th and 12th grade.

References

External links 
 VSI Tampa Bay Profile.

1989 births
Living people
Gambian footballers
Gambian expatriate footballers
Ocala Stampede players
VSI Tampa Bay FC players
Dayton Dutch Lions players
Kitsap Pumas players
Association football forwards
Expatriate soccer players in the United States
USL League Two players
National Premier Soccer League players
USL Championship players
Tampa Bay Rowdies 2 players
F.A. Euro players